The Ninety Mile Beach is a sandy stretch of beach on the south-eastern coastline of the East Gippsland region of Victoria in Australia. The beach faces Bass Strait and backs the Gippsland Lakes.

Behind the beach are long sandy dunes that separate the Gippsland Lakes from Bass Strait. The beach is an uninterrupted stretch of untamed coastline; it does not have any rocky headlands or platforms, and offshore there are only a few ribbons of reef which are periodically covered by sand.

In the northern section, the beach runs along a sandbar on what amounts to a series of tidal islands. Behind this are several large lakes and numerous shallow littoral lagoons. The three main lakes are Lake King, Lake Victoria and Lake Wellington, partially contained within The Lakes National Park.

Location
The beach is located within the Gippsland Lakes Coastal Park, with the Ninety Mile Beach Marine National Park located off-shore.

Tourism 
Ninety Mile Beach attracts a large number of visitors each year and offers a wide variety of activities such as camping, picnicking, whale watching, and beach and water-based activities. The beach has golden sand, with crashing waves and a natural bush environment.

There are basic camping facilities within the park at Emu Bight, as well as accommodation at Seaspray and Lakes Entrance.

Coastal towns of Woodside, Lochsport, Seaspray, Golden Beach and Lakes Entrance are popular tourist towns, attracting large numbers of visitors during the warmer months. Woodside, Seaspray and Lakes Entrance have life saving beach patrols during the summer season.

Surf fishing is a key drawcard for the area, with main varieties of fish including snapper, flathead and gummy sharks. Port Albert, McLoughlins Beach, Lochsport and Lakes Entrance have jetties and temporary berthing facilities.

Ecology
The beach's length ensures that the waves break too close to the beach for good surfing, and there are strong rip currents and cross-currents that make conditions rather hazardous.  The local authorities recommend that anyone who wishes to swim should do so at Woodside, Seaspray and Lakes Entrance, which have life saving beach patrols during the summer season.

Wild horses were introduced to the park after the islands were explored to help eat and trample down small areas of bush so it could be more easily explored but they were left unchecked and their numbers quickly increased. Their large numbers grew and over time started to cause concern as environmental damage became an issue, but once the park was established as a national heritage the horses were rounded up and transported back across to the mainland.

Gallery

References

External links 

 Gippsland's Official tourism website - Ninety Mile Beach
 Parks Victoria - Gippsland Lakes Coastal Park
 Parks Victoria - The Lakes National Park
 Gippsland's official tourism website - Beach fishing
 Gippsland Ports Victoria

East Gippsland
Beaches of Victoria (Australia)
2